Il bacio di Cirano is a 1913 silent Italian drama film directed by Carmine Gallone. It was Gallone's debut film as a director.

Cast
 Umberto Zanuccoli
 Soava Gallone as Grazia
 Romano Calò as Claudio Arcieri
 Tatiana Gorka as Rosetta
 Luciano Molinari
 Renato Piacentini
 Diomede Procaccini
 Ernesto Treves

References

External links
 

1913 films
1913 drama films
1913 directorial debut films
Italian silent feature films
Italian black-and-white films
Films directed by Carmine Gallone
Italian drama films
Silent drama films